Giancarlo Masini (born 10 January 1970) is a former Italian paralympic cyclist who won a bronze medal at the 2016 Summer Paralympics.

References

External links
 

1970 births
Living people
Paralympic cyclists of Italy
Paralympic bronze medalists for Italy
Medalists at the 2016 Summer Paralympics
Paralympic medalists in cycling
Cyclists at the 2016 Summer Paralympics
Paralympic athletes of Fiamme Azzurre
Cyclists from the Province of Brescia